Volodymyr Burakov (Ukrainian: Володимир Бураков; born 6 May 1985) is a Ukrainian sprinter competing primarily in the 400 metres. He represented his country in the 4 × 400 metres relay at the 2013 World Championships without qualifying for the final. In addition, he finished fourth individually at the 2013 European Indoor Championships.

In 2016 he won two silver medals, in 200m and 400m sprints, at the Rio Paralympics, as the sighted guide for visually impaired Ukrainian athlete Oksana Boturchuk.

International competitions

Personal bests
Outdoor
200 metres – 21.25 (0.0 m/s, Yalta 2008)
400 metres – 46.07 (Yalta 2012)
Indoor
400 metres – 46.70 (Sumy 2013)

References

1985 births
Living people
Ukrainian male sprinters
World Athletics Championships athletes for Ukraine
Athletes (track and field) at the 2016 Summer Paralympics
Paralympic silver medalists for Ukraine
Medalists at the 2016 Summer Paralympics
Paralympic medalists in athletics (track and field)
Paralympic athletes of Ukraine
21st-century Ukrainian people